Leucostoma  may refer to:
 Leucostoma (fly), a fly genus in the family Tachinidae
 Leucostoma (fungus), a genus of fungi within the family Valsaceae